The Salesian Pontifical University is a pontifical university in Italy run by the Salesians of Don Bosco. It has three campuses, one in Rome, one in Turin, and one in Jerusalem. The Salesian Pontifical University is an ordinary member of the International Federation of Catholic Universities, the European Federation of Catholic Universities, the European University Association and the International Association of Universities.

History
The university began with the founding of the Foglizzo Canavese theological studentate in 1904, which in 1923 moved to Turin. The university was canonically erected by the Congregation for Catholic Education with the decree of 3 May 1940 (Prot. N. 265/40) with the official title Pontificio Ateneo Salesiano (Latin for 'Salesian Pontificial Athenaeum'). During the Second World War students and teachers were transferred to the Salesian house in Bagnolo Piemonte.

In 1958 the Salesian Pontifical Athenaeum moved to Rome. On 24 May 1973, Pope Paul VI approved its new title Pontificia Studiorum Universitas Salesiana (Salesian Pontifical University) with the motu proprio Magisterium vitae. On 8 December 1986, a Department of Youth Pastoral and Catechetics was constituted by an agreement between the Faculties of Theology and Education.

In 2012 the Faculty of the Sciences of Social Communication began to offer Catholic priests (who, by virtue of their priestly studies, possess a Bachelor's degree in either Philosophy or Theology) a three-year Master's Degree in Pastoral Communication that includes a one-year Bachelor's in Communication.

On 10 October 2006, Cardinal Tarcisio Bertone, in his first year as Cardinal Secretary of State, gave a homily there celebrating the opening of the new academic year.

Faculties
 Theology; 
 Education; 
 Philosophy; 
 Canon Law; 
 Christian and Classical Literature; and 
 Sciences of Social Communication.

Notable members

Faculty 
Tarcisio Bertone
Alfons Maria Stickler
Ludwig Schwarz
Antonio María Javierre Ortas

Alumni 
 Angelo Amato
 Rosalio José Castillo Lara
 Joseph Zen
 Carlos Filipe Ximenes Belo

References

External links

Official site

1940 establishments in Italy
Education in Rome
Educational institutions established in 1940
Salesian
Properties of the Holy See
Catholic Church in Italy
Salesian Pontifical University
Seminaries and theological colleges in Italy
Salesian colleges and universities